Antispila inouei is a moth of the family Heliozelidae. It was described by Kuroko in 1987. It is found in Japan.

The larvae feed on Vitis coignetiae and Vitis labruscana. They mine the leaves of their host plant.

References

Moths described in 1987
Heliozelidae
Moths of Japan